The Northern Illinois Huskies baseball team is a varsity intercollegiate athletic team of Northern Illinois University (NIU) in DeKalb, Illinois, United States. The team is a member of the Mid-American Conference (MAC) West division, which is part of the NCAA Division I. NIU's first baseball team was fielded in 1900. The team plays its home games at Ralph McKinzie Field in DeKalb, Illinois. The Huskies are coached by Mike Kunigonis.

History
, Northern Illinois and Akron are the only current or former MAC schools not to have a player named the MAC Baseball Player of the Year or MAC Baseball Pitcher of the Year since those awards were first given in 1986 and 1988 respectively.

Conference membership
 1900–22: Independent
 1923–66: Illinois Intercollegiate Athletic Conference
 1967: Independent
 1968–70: NCAA Division I Independent
 1971–73: Midwestern Conference
 1974–82: Mid-American Conference
 1983–90: Program disbanded
 1991: NCAA Division I Independent
 1992–94: Mid-Continent Conference
 1995–97: Midwestern Collegiate Conference
 1998 to present: Mid-American Conference (West Division)

Year-by-year results

Coaching staff
On January 5, 2015, NIU announced Mike Kunigonis as the next baseball head coach.
Mike Kunigonis – Head Coach
Andrew Maki – Assistant Coach
Luke Stewart – Assistant Coach
Josh Pethoud – Volunteer Assistant

See also
List of NCAA Division I baseball programs

References

 
Baseball teams established in 1900
1900 establishments in Illinois